The 1971 All-Ireland Minor Hurling Championship was the 41st staging of the All-Ireland Minor Hurling Championship. The championship began on 15 August 1971 and ended on 5 September 1971.

Cork were the defending champions.

On 5 September 1971, Cork won the championship following a 2-11 to 1-11 defeat of Kilkenny in the All-Ireland final. This was their 11th All-Ireland title and their third in successive championship seasons.

Cork's Pat Buckley was the championship's top scorer with 3-13.

Teams

Results

All-Ireland Minor Hurling Championship

Semi-final

Final

Scoring statistics

Overall

Top scorers in a single game

External links
 All-Ireland Minor Hurling Championship: Roll Of Honour

Minor
All-Ireland Minor Hurling Championship